ZOOMQ3D is a numerical finite-difference model, which simulates groundwater flow in aquifers.  The program is used by hydrogeologists to investigate groundwater resources and to make predictions about possible future changes in their quantity and quality. The code is written in C++, an object-oriented programming language and can compile and run on Windows and Unix operating systems.

Groundwater flow equation 
ZOOMQ3D applies a quasi-three-dimensional finite-difference approximation to the general three-dimensional governing partial differential groundwater flow equation:

where:
 is the potentiometric head at a point  and time  (L)
 is a volumetric flux per unit volume representing sources and/or sinks of water, where negative values are abstractions, and positive values are injections (T−1) and,
 is the specific storage of the porous material (L−1)

This equation is derived by considering a flow balance for an infinitesimally small volume element located anywhere within a body of saturated aquifer.  A number of assumptions underlie this equation.  First, the fluid is assumed to be of constant density; this allows the flow balance to be a consequence of mass conservation within the element.  Next, the Cartesian coordinate system is aligned with the principal axes of the hydraulic conductivity tensor; this avoids the need for cross derivatives.

A model, based on the above equation, incorporating appropriate boundary and initial conditions, would be truly three-dimensional.  ZOOMQ3D takes a simplifying approach to the solution of the three-dimensional equation by recognising that in many aquifers it is possible to identify a layered structure.  If the layers are aligned parallel to the horizontal coordinate axes, then the three-dimensional equation can be integrated vertically across the layer to produce an equation which describes the flow within a layer and its interactions with adjacent layers.  Such an equation is:

where:
 is the potentiometric head within a layer (L)
 is time (T)
 is a volumetric flux per unit plan area representing sources and/or sinks of water, where negative values are abstractions, and positive values are injections (LT−1)
 is the storage coefficient of the porous material (L0) and,
above and below are leakage rates from layers above and below (LT−1)

Model features

History of development 
The groundwater flow model ZOOMQ3D is one of the codes in the ZOOM family of numerical groundwater models which also consists of the advective transport particle tracking code ZOOPT and the distributed recharge model ZOODRM. Each of these models has been developed using object-oriented techniques, a programming approach commonly applied in commercial software development but only relatively recently adopted in numerical modelling for scientific analysis.

ZOOMQ3D and ZOOPT have been developed through a tri-partite collaboration between the School of Civil Engineering of the University of Birmingham, UK, the British Geological Survey and the Environment Agency of England and Wales. The distributed recharge model ZOODRM has been developed by the British Geological Survey. All models are maintained by the British Geological Survey.

Link to the geological modelling package GSI3D 
A link exists between ZOOMQ3D and the geological modelling software GSI3D. The link facilitates the transfer of the structure of a geological model into a ZOOMQ3D groundwater model. After a GSI3D geological model is constructed it can be used to create a hydrogeological model of an aquifer.  This is achieved by assigning hydrogeological parameters, such as hydraulic conductivity, to the geological units.  Once this has been completed the resulting hydrogeological model can then be converted to a layered ZOOMQ3D groundwater model.

References 
 Jackson CR. (2001). The development and validation of the object-oriented quasi-three-dimensional regional groundwater flow model ZOOMQ3D.  British Geological Survey Internal Report IR/01/144.
 Jackson CR & Spink AEF. (2004). User's manual for the groundwater flow model ZOOMQ3D.  British Geological Survey Internal Report IR/04/140.
 Spink AEF, Hughes AG, Jackson CR & Mansour MM. (2006). Object-Oriented Design in Groundwater Modeling.  Proceedings of MODFLOW 2006 conference, Golden, Colorado, US. May 2006.

External links 
  British Geological Survey Groundwater Modelling

Hydrology models
Geology software